Paul Asbjørn Bjerketvedt (born March 28, 1960 in Moss, Norway) is a Norwegian editor, and has been CEO of the Norwegian News Agency (NTB) since 2004.

In 2008, Bjerketvedt received the Nynorsk Editor Award.

References

Norwegian journalists
1960 births
Living people
People from Moss, Norway
21st-century Norwegian people